John Connor (1728–1757) was a mariner who ran the first ferry in Halifax Harbour, Nova Scotia, and was involved in the Attack at Mocodome during Father Le Loutre’s War, which effectively ended the Treaty of 1752.

Connor arrived unaccompanied on the Merry Jacks in 1749 with Edward Cornwallis. He later moved to Dartmouth. Mi'kmaw oral tradition indicates that the Mi'kmaq killed Connors pregnant wife Mary and daughter Martha in the Raid on Dartmouth (1751). In February 1752, by the order of the Nova Scotia Council, Connor established the first ferry in Halifax Harbour by the order of the Nova Scotia Council.  On 22 December 1752 he assigned his ferry operation to two other mariners.

He was later involved in the attack at Mocodome. Connor reported he killed the Mikmaq to escape captivity. He did not kill them for a bounty because there was no bounty at the time of the attack. Mi'kmaw oral tradition suggest that his involvement in the Attack at Mocodome was an act of revenge for the killing of his family in Dartmouth.  The July 1752 census indicates that John Connor was living within the town of Halifax with two adult males (his sons?) and one adult female (his wife?).

On 16 December 1757, Connor died during the French and Indian War at age 29 and was buried at the Old Burial Ground.

Legacy 
 namesake of Connor Street, Dartmouth, Nova Scotia

References 

People of Father Le Loutre's War
1757 deaths
1728 births